Bonifacio Day is a national holiday in the Philippines, commemorating Andrés Bonifacio, one of the country's national heroes. He was the founder and eventual Supremo of the Katipunan, a secret society that triggered the Philippine Revolution of 1896 against the Spanish Empire. It is celebrated every November 30, the birth anniversary of Bonifacio.

History
Since 1901, Bonifacio's birthday has been celebrated by civic organizations. By 1920, Senator Lope K. Santos filed a bill to declare November 30 a holiday. In 1921, the governor general approved the bill as Act No. 2946. The law did not name Bonifacio and added November 30 to the list of holidays listed at Act No. 2711. In time, it became a holiday to commemorate all Filipino heroes; this persisted even when a separate National Heroes' Day holiday was declared in 1931. In 1942, November 30 was declared as National Heroes' Day. In 1952 (the Philippines by this time now independent), president Elpidio Quirino separated National Heroes' Day and Bonifacio Day by an executive order. Quirino explained in a speech at the National Teachers College that the "change has become necessary because of the interest from different sectors of our country to celebrate each hero's anniversary in order to perpetuate his name."

Unlike Rizal Day which is held on the death anniversary of José Rizal, Bonifacio Day is celebrated on his birth date. This is because of the controversial events on which Bonifacio was executed by his fellow revolutionaries during time of the Philippine Revolution.

Bonifacio Day in 2023 would be celebrated on November 27 instead of November 30, by virtue of Proclamation 90 under President Bongbong Marcos. The holiday was included in the "holiday economics," adjusting the observance of the holiday to the nearest Monday for a longer weekend.

Ceremonies 
Bonifacio Day ceremonies are usually held at the Bonifacio Monument in Caloocan, and is usually led by the incumbent president. It is also held at places with significance to Bonifacio, especially other monuments of him.

Bonifacio Days in history 
In November 30, 1941, days before the Japanese invasion of the Philippines, president Manuel L. Quezon warned of the impending war against the Japanese in a speech at the University of the Philippines Manila.

References 

November events
Public holidays in the Philippines